CKOE-FM is a Canadian FM radio station, broadcasting a contemporary christian format at 107.3 MHz in Moncton, New Brunswick. The station is branded as CKO-1, and should not be confused with Canada's defunct CKO radio news network. The station started as CKOE (Christ, King Of Everything) and later dropped the "E" to appeal to a wider, non-Christian audience.

History
Owned by Houssen Broadcasting Ltd., the station originally launched as Xtreme 101 FM in 2001 on 100.9 FM, and moved to its current frequency in 2004  after a denial to change frequencies in 2003. In 2006, the CRTC denied Houssen Broadcasting Ltd.'s application to increase power from 50 watts to 725 watts. The station is looking to appeal to a broader audience citing it is "safe and fun for everyone" and that the lyrics from songs heard on the station will not have to be censored to younger listeners.

In addition to local programming, the station carries the syndicated John Tesh Radio Show program.

References

External links
CKO-1
 

Koe
Koe
Radio stations established in 2001
2001 establishments in New Brunswick